Germany competed at the 1932 Summer Olympics in Los Angeles, United States. 144 competitors, 135 men and 9 women, took part in 67 events in 15 sports.

Medalists

Athletics

Boxing

Cycling

Four cyclist, all men, represented Germany in 1932.

Individual road race
 Werner Wittig
 Julius Maus
 Hubert Ebner
 Henry Tröndle

Team road race
 Werner Wittig
 Julius Maus
 Hubert Ebner
 Henry Tröndle

Diving

Fencing

Two fencers, one man and one woman, represented Germany in 1932.

Men's foil
 Erwin Casmir

Men's sabre
 Erwin Casmir

Women's foil
 Helene Mayer

Modern pentathlon

Three male pentathletes represented Germany in 1932.

 Willi Remer
 Konrad Miersch
 Helmuth Naudé

Rowing

Sailing

Shooting

One shooter represented Germany in 1932, winning a silver medal in the 25 m pistol event.

25 m rapid fire pistol
 Heinrich Hax

Swimming

Water polo

Weightlifting

Wrestling

Art competitions

Officials  
 Tom Sullivan, rowing team coach

References

External links
Official Olympic Reports
International Olympic Committee results database

Nations at the 1932 Summer Olympics
1932
Summer Olympics